Geordie is a masculine given name. It may also be a nickname for people named George or associated with the Tyneside area of North East England.

Notable people known as Geordie include:

 George Armstrong (footballer) (1944–2000), English football player and coach
 George P. Anderson (1885–1958), Australian rules footballer
 George Best (1946–2005), Northern Irish footballer
 Geordie Bourne (died 1597), Scottish thief or raider
 Ralph Bullock (jockey) (1841–1863), Derby-winning British jockey
 George Geordie Dewar (1867–1915), Scottish footballer
 George Douglas-Hamilton, 10th Earl of Selkirk (1906–1994), Scottish Second World War Royal Air Force officer and politician
 George Drummond (footballer, born 1865) (1865–1914), Scottish footballer
 George Geordie Greig (born 1960), English journalist and editor of The Mail on Sunday
 George Geordie Hormel (1928–2006), American music composer and recording studio proprietor
 George Ker, Scottish footballer of the 1870s and 1880s
 Geordie Lyall (born 1976), Canadian soccer player
 George Geordie Neave, English footballer
 Fredrik Geordie Newman, English-born New Zealand footballer
 Gordon Geordie Reid (1882–1960), Scottish footballer
 Gordon Geordie Richardson (1835–1905), English-born New Zealand merchant, entrepreneur and ship owner
 George "Geordie" Ridley (1835–1864), English concert hall song writer and performer
 Geordie Stewart (born 1989), British author and mountaineer
 Kevin Geordie Walker (born 1958), British-American guitarist with the post-punk group Killing Joke
 Geordie Williamson (born 1981), Australian mathematician and professor
 a mocking nickname for King George I of Great Britain in the folksong "Cam Ye O'er Frae France"

See also 

 Jordi
 Jordie
 Jordy

Lists of people by nickname